Stephen Akers (born 16 May 1971) is a male retired British swimmer. He competed in the 1992 Summer Olympics. He represented England in the 1,500 metres freestyle, at the 1990 Commonwealth Games in Auckland, New Zealand.

References

1971 births
Living people
Swimmers at the 1992 Summer Olympics
British male swimmers
Olympic swimmers of Great Britain
People from Shoreham-by-Sea
Swimmers at the 1990 Commonwealth Games
British male freestyle swimmers
Commonwealth Games competitors for England